Sam Ftorek (born November 30, 1974) is an American former professional ice hockey defenseman, who last played with the Norfolk Admirals of the ECHL. He is the son of former NHL player and coach Robbie Ftorek.

He played with the Kalamazoo Wings of the ECHL from 2009 to 2015. On June 18, 2015, Ftorek announced his retirement from professional hockey after 17 seasons and was announced as an assistant coach with the Kalamazoo Wings.

On April 29, 2016, after one season as an assistant coach in Kalamazoo, he was named the first head coach of the Southern Professional Hockey League's Roanoke Rail Yard Dawgs. 

In December 2017, Ftorek was elected to the ECHL Hall of Fame. 11 days later, on December 18th, 2017, Ftorek was relieved of his coaching duties in Roanoke, in favor of Dan Bremner. Over 74 games in the Rail Yard Dawgs' two seasons, Ftorek's team finished with a record of 22-41-11.  He would return to the Norfolk Admirals as a player for 22 games, before retiring again at the end of the '17-'18 season.

Awards and honors

References

External links
 

1974 births
Living people
Fehérvár AV19 players
Amarillo Gorillas players
American men's ice hockey defensemen
Augusta Lynx players
Bloomington PrairieThunder players
Bracknell Bees players
Cincinnati Cyclones (ECHL) players
Fresno Falcons players
Greensboro Generals players
Gwinnett Gladiators players
Kalamazoo Wings (ECHL) players
EHC Kloten players
Manchester Monarchs (AHL) players
Mobile Mysticks players
Norfolk Admirals (ECHL) players
Saint Anselm College alumni
Saint Anselm Hawks men's ice hockey players